Monopoly Capital: An Essay on the American Economic and Social Order is a 1966 book by the Marxian economists Paul Sweezy and Paul A. Baran. It was published by Monthly Review Press. It made a major contribution to Marxian theory by shifting attention from the assumption of a competitive economy to the monopolistic economy associated with the giant corporations that dominate the modern accumulation process. Their work played a leading role in the intellectual development of the New Left in the 1960s and 1970s. As a review in the American Economic Review stated, it represented "the first serious attempt to extend Marx’s model of competitive capitalism to the new conditions of monopoly capitalism."  It attracted renewed attention following the Great Recession.

Argument
Big business can maintain setting prices at high levels while still competing to cut costs, advertise, and market their products. The actual and potential economic surplus generated exceeds the existing outlets for investment and capitalist consumption. Private accumulation therefore requires the support of government spending geared primarily towards imperialistic and militaristic government tendencies, which is the easiest and surest way to utilize surplus productive capacity. Other forms of absorbing the surplus include expansion of the sales effort and the growth of finance, insurance, and real estate

The economic surplus
One of the key contributions of Monopoly Capital is its application of the concept of economic surplus. The economic surplus is most simply the difference between “what a society produces and the costs of producing it. The size of the surplus is an index of productivity and wealth, of how much freedom a society has to accomplish whatever goals it may set for itself. The composition of the surplus shows how it uses that freedom: how much it invests in expanding its productive capacity, how much it consumes in various forms, how much it wastes and in what ways.”  
Although some scholars viewed the introduction of this concept as a break with the Marxist approach to value, later publications by Baran and Sweezy, as well as other authors, have continued to establish the importance of this innovation, its consistency with Marx's labor concept of value, and supplementary relation to Marx's category of surplus value.
Baran and Sweezy argue that under the oligopolistic conditions of modern economies—dominated by big business—the surplus tends to rise. The vast extent of this increasing actual and potential surplus is visible in the underutilization of productive capacity, the level of unemployment, the waste embodied in the sales effort, and military spending. This is because monopoly/oligopoly conditions result in both insufficient opportunities for profitable reinvestment of the surplus (which shows up as excess capacity and unemployment) and forms of non-price competition involve large amounts of unproductive labor (e.g. in the sales effort and product differentiation). The overall result is a tendency toward economic stagnation and increased unproductive expenditures as a response.

Problems of surplus absorption and waste 
Baran and Sweezy highlighted five aspects of the surplus absorption problem. First, that capitalist class luxury consumption could not rise as fast as the available surplus and monopoly conditions limited outlets for productive investment. Second, spending on the sales effort was an important outlet for surplus as large firms engaged in non-price forms of competition and sought to enlarge demand. However, such marketing expenditures (advertising, sales promotion, excessive model changes, etc.) do not provide any additional use-value and therefore may be treated as waste. Third, capitalist opposition to civilian spending as a threat to their class interests and class power limited the ability of such spending to provide effective demand. Fourth, military spending does not compete with capitalist interests in the same way as civilian spending and through imperialism serves to enhance those interests. Therefore, military spending is able to expand to a degree civilian spending is not, providing an important outlet for surplus absorption. Fifth, spending on finance can serve to absorb a portion of the surplus and boost the economy, at the expense of greater debt expansion and long-term instability.

The irrational qualities of monopoly capitalist society
In the book’s concluding chapters Baran and Sweezy highlight the growing disparity between the productive potential of US society and the waste and misuse of that potential. They point to racial disparities and the social and cultural costs of the current structure of the political economic system where real basic needs for human development such as education and housing are not met while a belligerent militarism and cultural traits associated today with “consumerism” are cultivated with great effort in the interests of profit. They see the primary weaknesses of the system to be in the imperial realm, as countries in the periphery revolt against the domination of monopoly capital over their economies, a revolt that is increasingly mirrored in the resistance of peoples of color, making up a critical part of the working class, within the United States itself.

Monopoly capital and the Great Recession
With the financial crisis of 2007–2009 and the Great Recession of these years, followed by conditions of economic stagnation, some political economists have argued that Baran and Sweezy's analysis in Monopoly Capital is key to the theoretical and historical explanation of these events. This has led to an extension of theory to address what is called "monopoly-finance capital," the "internationalization of monopoly capital," the globalization of the reserve army of labor, and the growing monopolization of communications, most dramatically the Internet.

See also
History of economic thought
Marxism

References

Further reading
Baran, Paul A. & Sweezy, Paul M. Monopoly Capital: An essay on the American economic and social order (New York: Monthly Review Press, 1966)
Nicholas Baran and John Bellamy Foster, eds., The Age of Monopoly Capital, The Selected Correspondence of Paul A. Baran and Paul M. Sweezy, 1949-1964 (Monthly Review Press, New York, 2017).
Paul Auerbach and Peter Skott, "Concentration, Competition and Distribution: A Critique of Theories of Monopoly Capital", International Review of Applied Economics, vol. 2 (1), 1988, pp. 42–61
Michael F. Bleaney, Underconsumption Theories: A History and Critical Analysis (New York: International Publishers, 1976), pp. 225–243
Braverman, Harry. Labor and Monopoly Capital: The Degradation of Work in the Twentieth Century (New York: Monthly Review Press, 1974)
Joseph Choonara, "Marxist accounts of the current crisis", International Socialism, Issue 123, 24 June 2009
Peter Clecak, Radical Paradoxes: Dilemmas of the American Left, 1945-1970 (New York: Harper & Row, 1973), pp. 72–174
Keith Cowling, Monopoly Capitalism (London: Macmillan, 1982)
Ben Fine; Andy Murfin, Macroeconomics and Monopoly Capitalism (Brighton: Wheatsheaf Books, 1984) 
Fusfeld, Daniel R. (1994) The Age of the Economist, pp. 151–2, Harper Collins, 7th Ed. 
Robert L. Heilbroner, "A Marxist America", New York Review of Books, 26 May 1966, pp. 22–4, reprinted in Robert L. Heilbroner, Between Capitalism and Socialism (New York: Random House, 1970), pp. 237–246
Robert R. Keller, "Monopoly Capital and the Great Depression: Testing Baran and Sweezy's Hypothesis", Review of Radical Political Economics, vol. 7 (4), December 1975, pp. 65–75
Michael C. Howard; John E. King, A History of Marxian Economics, Volume II: 1929-1990 (London: Palgrave Macmillan, 1992), pp. 109–127, 313–316
Andrew Kliman, The Failure of Capitalist Production: Underlying Causes of the Great Recession (London: Pluto Press, 2012), pp. 151–180
Bill Lucarelli, Monopoly Capitalism in Crisis (London: Palgrave Macmillan, 2004)
Bellod Redondo, J. F. (2008); "Monopolio e Irracionalidad: Microfundamentos de la Teoría Baran - Sweezy"; revista Principios - Estudios de Economía Política, pp 65 – 84, nº 10, Fundación Sistema, Madrid.
Michael Lebowitz, Following Marx (Boston: Brill, 2009)
Thomas E. Lambert; Edward Kwon, "Monopoly Capital and Capitalist Inefficiency", International Review of Applied Economics, vol. 29 (4), February 2015, pp. 533–552
Thomas E. Lambert, "Monopoly Capital and Entrepreneurism: Whither Small Business?", Cambridge Journal of Economics, March 2019
Thomas E. Lambert, "Monopoly Capital and Innovation: An Exploratory Assessment of R&D Effectiveness", International Review of Applied Economics, May 2019
Raymond Lubitz, "Monopoly capitalism and neo-Marxism", The Public Interest, Issue number 21, Fall 1970, pp. 167–178
Foster, John Bellamy; Magdoff, Fred. The Great Financial Crisis (Monthly Review Press, 2009)
McChesney, Robert W.; Foster, John Bellamy; Stole, Inger L.; & Holleman, Hannah. "The Sales Effort and Monopoly Capital", Monthly Review, April 2009
E.K. Hunt and Mark Lautzenheiser, History of Economic Thought: A Critical Perspective, third edition (Armonk, New York: M.E. Sharpe, 2011) pp 530–32
 Paul Mattick, Anti-Bolshevik Communism (Monmouth: Merlin Press, 1978), pp. 187–209
 Foster, John Bellamy & McChesney, Robert W. The Endless Crisis: How Monopoly-Finance Capital Produces Stagnation and Upheaval from the USA to China (Monthly Review Press, 2012)
Robert W. McChesney, Digital Disconnect (New York: New Press, 2013)
Bob Milward, Globalisation? Internationalisation and Monopoly Capitalism: Historical Processes and Capitalist Dynamism (Cheltenham: Edward Elgar, 2003)
Bruce Norton, "The Accumulation of Capital as Historical Essence: A Critique of the Theory of Monopoly Capitalism", Discussion Paper Series, Association for Economic and Social Analysis, Amherst, Mass., November 1983
Christian Pépin, "La stagnation à l'ère de la financiarisation et de la globalisation du capitalisme avancé: interprétation critique de l'école de la Monthly Review", Master's thesis, Université du Québec à Montréal, 2015
Luis A. Pérez-Feliciano, The American Political Economy and Monopoly Capital: A Reinterpretation (VDM Verlag Dr. Müller, 2009)
Luis A. Pérez-Feliciano, "The Myth of Monopoly Capital", International Journal of Arts and Commerce, Vol. 1, No. 7 (December 2012), pp. 143–158
Malcolm C. Sawyer, "Theories of Monopoly Capitalism", Journal of Economic Surveys, Vol. 2, No. 1 (March 1988), pp. 47–76
Anwar Shaikh, "An Introduction to the History of Crisis Theories" in U.S. Capitalism in Crisis (New York: U.R.P.E., 1978), pp. 219–241
Anwar Shaikh, Capitalism: Competition, Conflict, Crises (New York: Oxford University Press, 2016), pp. 353–7
Ron Stanfield, The Economic Surplus and Neo-Marxism (Lexington, Mass.: D.C. Heath & Co., 1973)
Fabian van Onzen 'Service Workers in the Era of Monopoly Capital' (Leiden, Brill, 2021)
Sam Williams, "The Monthly Review School", A Critique of Crisis Theory From a Marxist perspective blog, 28 February 2010
Erik Olin Wright, "Alternative Perspectives in Marxist Theory of Accumulation and Crisis", The Insurgent Sociologist, Fall 1975, reprinted in The Subtle Analysis of Capitalism, ed. Jesse Schwartz (Santa Monica: Goodyear Publishers, 1977)
Jonas Zoninsein, Monopoly Capital Theory: Hilferding and Twentieth-Century Capitalism (New York: Greenwood Press, 1990) 

1966 non-fiction books
1966 in economics
Imperialism studies
American non-fiction books
Books about capitalism
Books by Paul Sweezy
English-language books
Marxist books
Monthly Review Press books